Veitch or Vetch is a Scottish surname, and may refer to:

Veitch 
 Arthur Veitch (1844–1880), horticulturist
 Bill Veitch (1870–1961), New Zealand politician
 Champion Doug Veitch (born 1960), Scottish musician and songwriter
 Colin Veitch (1881–1938), England and Newcastle United footballer
 Darren Veitch (born 1960), Canadian hockey player
 Edward W. Veitch (1924–2013), American mathematician
 Harry Veitch (1840–1924), horticulturist 
 Heather Veitch (born 1973/4), American Christian missionary and former stripper
 James Veitch, Lord Elliock (1712–1793), Scottish lawyer and politician, MP for Dumfriesshire 1755–61, judge from 1761
 James Veitch (horticulturist) (1792–1863), horticulturist
 James Veitch, Jr. (1815–1869), horticulturist 
 James Herbert Veitch (1868–1907), horticulturist 
 James Veitch (comedian) (born 1980), comedian
 James Alexander Veitch  (born 1940), academic, theologian, historian
 Joel Veitch (born 1974), English web animator 
 John Veitch (horticulturist) (1752–1839), founder of Veitch Nurseries
 John Veitch (poet) (1829–1894), Scottish poet, philosopher, and historian
 John Gould Veitch (1839–1870), horticulturist
 John Veitch (footballer) (1869–1914), English footballer
 John M. Veitch (born 1945), American horse trainer
 Kristin Veitch (born 1975), TV columnist
 Marion Veitch (1639–1722), Scottish diarist
 Michael Veitch (born 1962), Australian comedian 
 Mildred Veitch (1889–1971), horticulturist 
 Peter Veitch (1850–1929), horticulturist 
 Rick Veitch (born 1951), American comic book artist and writer  
 Robert Veitch (1823–1855), horticulturist 
 Samuel Veitch or Vetch (1668–1732), Scottish army officer and colonial governor of Nova Scotia
 Sylvester Veitch (1910–1996), horse trainer
 Tom Veitch (1941–2022), American comic book artist and writer
 Tony Veitch (born 1973), New Zealand broadcaster
 William Veitch (1640–1722), Scottish minister
 William Veitch (1794–1885), classical scholar

Vetch 
Samuel Vetch (1668–1732), Scottish soldier and governor of Nova Scotia
James Vetch (1789–1869), Scottish officer of the Royal Engineers
Hamilton Vetch (1804–1865), Scottish officer of the Bengal Army, brother of James Vetch
Robert Hamilton Vetch (1841–1916), Royal Engineers officer and biographer, son of the above

See also
 Veitch Nurseries
 Veatch

References

Scottish surnames